Neotermes kemneri, is a species of dry wood termite of the genus Neotermes. It is native to India and Sri Lanka.

References

External links
BIBLIOMETRICS ON ONE OF THE LARGEST TERMITE INVENTORIES IN THE CERRADO: "STUDIES ON TERMITES FROM THE MATO GROSSO STATE, BRAZIL BY AGA MATHEWS 1977
Endemic Termites of Sri Lanka

Termites
Insects described in 1960
Endemic fauna of India